Established in 1990, Splashy Fen is South Africa's longest-running music festival, which every Easter attracts thousands of people to a farm near Underberg, KwaZulu-Natal for a unique outdoor music experience. Also present are arts and crafts stalls, food and drink outlets, crèche and children's entertainment programme, as well as various camping and accommodation options. The most recent festival took place from the 14th-17th April 2022.

Well-known artists who have performed at Splashy Fen over the years include: Wheatus, Bowling for Soup, Kim Churchill, Syd Kitchen, Tony Cox, Steve Newman, Ladysmith Black Mambazo, Vusi Mahlasela, Koos Kombuis, Shawn Phillips, Hinds Brothers, Madala Kunene, Neill Solomon, Landscape Prayers, Tananas, Just Jinjer, Hothouse Flowers, Tree63, Dan Patlansky, Watershed, Springbok Nude Girls, The Parlotones, Prime Circle and Chris Chameleon.

Don Clarke, convener of the Legends of the Fen show, and his partner Dicky Roberts, have been managing and hosting the Legends showcase at the festival since 2016. This initiative brought South African icons like Steve Fataar (14 March 1943 - 31 January 2020) back to the festival. In 2019, Don Clarke and P J Powers shared the stage and performed the 1986 hit song, Sanbonani.

Ultimate Splashy Fen Song 
Don Clarke wrote the song, "Hey-na Splashy" in 2008, the year he made his debut appearance at the festival.

See also
Music of South Africa
Musical Performance
In The City
Oppikoppi
RAMFest

References

External links
 

Music festivals established in 1990
Folk festivals in South Africa
Autumn events in South Africa